Pelzer is an unincorporated community in Boon Township, Warrick County, in the U.S. state of Indiana.

History
A post office was established at Pelzer in 1898, and remained in operation until 1900. The community bears the name of a family of settlers. Frederick William Pelzer, a local Warrick County farmer, immigrated from Germany in 1860.

Geography

References

Unincorporated communities in Warrick County, Indiana
Unincorporated communities in Indiana